Lado Shirinshayevich Davidov (18 August 1924 - 30 July 1987) was a Soviet soldier during the Second World War and Hero of the Soviet Union.

Biography 
He was born in Vladikavkaz and was ethnically Assyrian.

In 1944 he was awarded the Hero of the Soviet Union and was one of only two Assyrians to have received the title. He died in Moscow on 30 July 1987.

References

Davidov, Lado
Davidov, Lado
Davidov, Lado
Davidov, Lado
People from Vladikavkaz
Recipients of the Medal "For Courage" (Russia)
Soviet military personnel of World War II